Andrei Lungu (born 29 January 1989) is a Romanian footballer who plays as a midfielder.

References

External links
 
 
 

1989 births
Living people
Sportspeople from Pitești
Romanian footballers
Romanian expatriate footballers
Association football midfielders
FC Sportul Studențesc București players
FC Universitatea Cluj players
FC Voluntari players
Hapoel Petah Tikva F.C. players
FC Energie Cottbus players
Hapoel Nir Ramat HaSharon F.C. players
ASC Daco-Getica București players
AFC Chindia Târgoviște players
FC Metaloglobus București players
FC Hermannstadt players
Liga I players
Liga Leumit players
3. Liga players
Liga II players
Expatriate footballers in Israel
Romanian expatriate sportspeople in Israel
Expatriate footballers in Germany
Romanian expatriate sportspeople in Germany